En with middle hook (Ԣ ԣ; italics: Ԣ ԣ) is a letter of the Cyrillic script. Its form is derived from the Cyrillic letter En (Н н) by adding a hook to the middle of the right leg.

En with middle hook was formerly used in the alphabet of the Chuvash language, where it represented the palatalised alveolar nasal .

Related letters and other similar characters
Н н : Cyrillic letter En
Ь ь : Cyrillic letter Soft sign
Ñ ñ : Latin letter N with tilde
Ń ń : Latin letter N with acute
Ň ň : Latin letter N with caron
Љ љ : Cyrillic letter Lje
Њ њ : Cyrillic letter Nje

Computing codes

See also 
Cyrillic characters in Unicode

References

Languages of Russia
Turkic languages
Cyrillic letters with diacritics
Letters with hook